Nasrin Sotoudeh is a human rights lawyer in Iran. She has represented imprisoned Iranian opposition activists and politicians following the disputed June 2009 Iranian presidential elections as well as prisoners sentenced to death for crimes committed when they were minors. Her clients have included journalist Isa Saharkhiz, Nobel Peace Prize laureate Shirin Ebadi, and Heshmat Tabarzadi. She has also represented women arrested for appearing in public without a hijab, which is a punishable offence in Iran.
Nasrin Sotoudeh was the subject of Nasrin, a 2020 documentary filmed in secret in Iran about Sotoudeh's "ongoing battles for the rights of women, children and minorities." In 2021, she was named as of Time'''s 100 Most Influential People in the World.

 Life 
Sotoudeh was arrested in September 2010 on charges of spreading propaganda and conspiring to harm state security and was imprisoned in solitary confinement in Evin Prison. In January 2011, Iranian authorities sentenced Sotoudeh to 11 years in prison, in addition to barring her from practicing law and from leaving the country for 20 years. Later that year, an appeals court reduced her sentence to six years and her practice ban to ten years.

In June 2018 she was again arrested, and on 12 March 2019 sentenced to jail in Tehran, after being charged with several national security-related offences. While a Tehran judge told the Islamic Republic News Agency she was imprisoned for seven years, it was reported by other sources that the maximum sentence included 10 years in prison and 148 lashes, along with six other verdicts and sentences totalling 38 years bundled together. However, the sentence was reduced later to 10 years total. She is still in Qarchak Prison as of July 2021 (see also below).

Family and education
Nasrin Sotoudeh was born in 1963 in a "religious, middle-class" Iranian family. She had hoped to study philosophy in college and ranked 53rd in the Iranian national university entrance exam but lacked high enough marks to get a place and ended up studying law at Shahid Beheshti University in Tehran. After completing her degree in international law from the university, Sotoudeh took and passed the bar exam successfully in 1995 but had to wait another eight years to be given her permit to practice law.

Sotoudeh is married to Reza Khandan. They have two children together. Sotoudeh has emphasised that Reza is "truly a modern man," standing beside her and her work during her struggles.

Work and activity
Sotoudeh started her career at the Iranian Ministry of Housing legal office and after two years joined the legal section of the state-owned Bank Tejarat. During her tenure at the bank she was "heavily involved with preparing the legal case and the legal arguments for many of the cases that Iran presented at The Hague" in its dispute with the United States during "the Algeria court summons there".

Sotoudeh's "first work in the field of women's rights" was a diverse collection of interviews, reports, and articles for the journal Daricheh. The editor-in-chief of the publication rejected the collection which "made Sotoudeh even more determined in her work for women's rights".

In 1995 at the age of 32 she took the Bar (Kanoon Vokala) exam and earned her lawyers credentials, and became one of the most active members of the law society. Sotoudeh's work has included defending abused children and mothers and working to protect abused children from returning to their abusive fathers. She believes that many abusers are ill or past victims of mistreatment themselves, and in need of professional care and medication. She hopes that the courts will make better use of child specialists and psychologists in verifying abuse cases to better protect innocent children.

Prior to her arrest, Sotoudeh represented activists and journalists such as Kourosh Zaim, Isa Saharkhiz, Heshmat Tabarzadi, Nahid Keshavarz, Parvin Ardalan, Omid Memarian, and Roya Tolouie, as well as child abuse and criminal cases. She worked closely with Nobel Peace Prize laureate Shirin Ebadi and her Defenders of Human Rights Center. Following Sotoudeh's arrest, Ebadi called for her release and expressed concern regarding her health. In the statement, Ebadi said, "Ms. Sotoudeh is one of the last remaining courageous human rights lawyers who has accepted all risks for defending the victims of human rights violations in Iran". Former Czech President Václav Havel and Zahra Rahnavard, the wife of opposition leader Mir-Hossein Mousavi, also called for Sotoudeh's release.

First arrest and trial
On 28 August 2010, Iranian authorities raided Sotoudeh's office. At the time, Sotoudeh was representing Zahra Bahrami, a Dutch-Iranian dual citizen charged with security offenses; it was unclear whether the raid was related to Bahrami. On 4 September 2010, Iranian authorities arrested Sotoudeh on charges of spreading propaganda and conspiring to harm state security. The Washington Post described the arrest as "highlighting an intensifying crackdown on lawyers who defend influential opposition politicians, activists and journalists."

Amnesty International launched an urgent call for her release, designating her a prisoner of conscience and noting that she was "at risk of torture or other ill-treatment". Sotoudeh, who was imprisoned in Evin Prison, was reportedly held in solitary confinement.

On 9 January 2011, Iranian authorities sentenced Sotoudeh to 11 years in jail for charges that include "activities against national security" and "propaganda against the regime." Additionally, she has been barred from practicing law and from leaving the country for 20 years. In mid-September 2011, an appeals court reduced Nasrin Sotoudeh's prison sentence to six years; her ban from working as a lawyer was reduced to ten years.

Hunger strikes
On 25 September 2010, she began a hunger strike to protest being denied visits and phone calls from her family. According to her husband, Sotoudeh ended her hunger strike four weeks later, on 23 October.
On 17 October 2012, Sotoudeh began an indefinite hunger strike in protest of new restrictions placed on her family visits. On the 47th day of strike, her husband described her condition as:Now her health condition is so drastic that I don't expect her steady until our next meeting. Dizziness, impaired vision, unsteadiness in walking and low pressure are alarming signs of deterioration, besides the extreme thinness. On 4 December 2012 Sotoudeh stopped her hunger strike after 49 days following a short visit of some parliament members at Evin prison where they acknowledged and implemented her requests on lifting her daughter's travel ban.
On 29 August 2018, Sotoudeh began a hunger strike to protest her detention and government harassment of her family and friends.

International response
Sotoudeh's imprisonment was widely condemned in the international community. In October 2010, the International Campaign for Human Rights in Iran, Human Rights Watch, the International Commission of Jurists, the International Federation for Human Rights, the Iranian League for the Defence of Human Rights, the Union Internationale des Avocats and the World Organisation Against Torture joined Amnesty International in a joint statement denouncing Sotoudeh's arrest and calling for her immediate release. The US condemned what it called the "unjust and harsh verdict" against Sotoudeh, and called her "a strong voice for rule of law and justice in Iran". On 20 December 2010, Amnesty International held a day-long protest at the Iranian embassy in London to protest her imprisonment. In January 2011, the Law Society of England and Wales also issued a call for her release.

On 26 October 2012, Sotoudeh was announced as a co-winner of the Sakharov Prize of the European Parliament. She shared the award with Iranian film director Jafar Panahi. European Parliament President Martin Schulz called the pair "a woman and a man who have not been bowed by fear and intimidation and who have decided to put the fate of their country before their own". European Union High Representative of the Union for Foreign Affairs and Security Policy Catherine Ashton stated of the prize, "I am following the case of Nasrin Sotoudeh and other human rights defenders with great concern ... We will continue to campaign for the charges against them to be dropped. We look to Iran to respect the human rights obligations it has signed up to". Human rights defender and freelance journalist William Nicholas Gomes demanded Immediate and unconditional release of Sotoudeh in August 2018.

 Release 
Sotoudeh was released on 18 September 2013 along with ten other political prisoners, including opposition leader Mohsen Aminzadeh, days before an address by Iranian President Hassan Rouhani to the United Nations. No explanation was given for her early release.

Second arrest and sentencing 

Sotoudeh was arrested again in June 2018. According to her lawyer, she was charged with espionage, dissemination of propaganda and disparaging the Supreme Leader of Iran, Ali Khamenei. She was given a five-year imprisonment for "acting against national security".

On 22 August 2018, 60 members of the European Parliament called on Iranian President Hassan Rouhani to forcefully work for Sotoudeh's "unconditional release."

On 6 March 2019, she was convicted in absentia, after refusing to attend the trial before Tehran's Islamic Revolutionary Court because she was unable to select her own counsel. She was charged with a number of offences, including being a member of a human rights organisation and stoking "corruption and prostitution".

On 11 March, Judge Mohammad Moqiseh told the Islamic Republic News Agency she was sentenced to five years for endangering the country's security through assembly and two years for insulting Khamenei.

On 12 March, Sotoudeh's husband, Reza Khandan, said that only the longest sentence of the current trial verdicts would be served, which is 10 years' imprisonment (for "encouraging corruption and debauchery and providing the means"), out of a total 33 years for seven charges bundled together; this was in addition to five years for another case, bringing the total to 38 years, plus 148 lashes.

On 28 July 2020, Khandan reported that Nasrin's bank accounts had been frozen on the orders of the Prosecutor's Office despite none of the charges against her being finance related.
 
On 17 August 2020, her daughter, Mehraveh Khandan was arrested at her home by security forces and released on bail later in the day. Iran Human Rights Director Mahmood Amiry-Moghaddam said: "The harassment is aimed at silencing Nasrin Sotoudeh, who is defending basic human rights with her hunger strike. The international community must prevent further harassment of human rights defenders by standing with Nasrin Sotoudeh.” 

On 20 October 2020, Sotoudeh was transferred from Evin Prison to Qarchak Prison in Varamin.

On 7 November 2020, she was temporarily freed, having tested positive for COVID-19, then returned to Qarchak Prison on 2 December 2020.

On 9 February 2021, her husband Reza Khandan's bank accounts were also frozen. Speaking to Iran Human Rights he said:  “Arresting my daughter and freezing my bank accounts are evidence that punishments have become familial, and when they want to punish an individual, they may violate their civil rights and privacy and even have them fired, freeze their bank accounts, ban them from leaving the country, in other words, use every opportunity to put pressure on that individual or their family members.”

Hunger strike 
On 11 August 2020, Nasrin went on hunger strike by publishing a letter demanding the release of political prisoners, it reads: "“The appellate process, parole, suspending execution sentences and a new law intent on issuing minimum sentences were all promised, but the enforcement of all these legal rights are assigned to interrogators who apply them extrajudicially, closing the last door on political prisoners. Sotoudeh ended her hunger strike on Sept. 26 on account of deteriorating health.”

International response

Before the verdict had been announced, the UN deputy high commissioner for human rights, Kate Gilmore, had been allowed to visit Sotoudeh. The visit was the first in many years by UN human rights investigators. The UN investigator on human rights in Iran, Javaid Rehman, raised Sotoudeh's case at the UN human rights council in Geneva on 11 March, saying that she had been "reportedly convicted of charges relating to her work and could face a lengthy prison sentence".

The Center for Human Rights in Iran afterwards criticised her conviction and said it proved that the Iranian government was sensitive to any peaceful criticism. Hadi Ghaemi, executive director, said that the charges, ranging from membership in a human rights group to "encouraging corruption and prostitution", suggests that her detention relates partly to her defence of women who had protested the mandatory hijab.

Amnesty International has condemned her sentencing and has stated motives for her conviction included her backing of women who opposed the mandatory hijab laws.

Philip Luther, Middle East and North Africa Research and Advocacy Director at Amnesty said: "Jailing a human rights defender for her peaceful activities is abhorrent but the fact that the judge in Nasrin Sotoudeh’s case used his discretion to ensure that she stays locked up for more than is required under Iranian law compounds the outrageous injustice of her sentence".

In April 2019 actor and activist Nazanin Boniadi was interviewed by CBC News Network anchor Natasha Fatah about female activists in Iran, including Sotoudeh. Boniadi said that Sotoudeh should be lauded and nominated for the Nobel Peace Prize, and also spoke of the bad reputation of the prison, where people were regularly tortured. She also spoke of the lack of support worldwide for the ordinary people of Iran.

In August 2021, a group of Democratic senators introduced a resolution condemning Iran for the unjust imprisonment of Nasrin. Sen. Bob Menendez of New Jersey, who heads the Senate Foreign Relations Committee, sponsored the resolution along with eight other Senate Democrats, including Ben Cardin and Chris Van Hollen of Maryland.

Awards and honors
2011 PEN/Barbara Goldsmith Freedom to Write Award
2011 Southern Illinois University School of Law Rule of Law Citation
 2011 Giuseppe Motta Medal
2012 Sakharov Prize
2018 Kurt Tucholsky Prize
On 21 September 2018, she was awarded the annual tribute for a lawyer, the twenty-third Ludovic-Trarieux International Human Rights Prize initially bestowed to Nelson Mandela in 1986 when in jail.
2019 Franco-German Prize for Human Rights and the Rule of Law, accepted on her behalf by fellow human rights lawyer Saeid Dehghan
 2019 Council of Bars and Law Societies of Europe (CCBE) Human Rights Award
 2020 Human Rights Prize of the German Judges Association
 2020 Right Livelihood Award
 2020 Keys to the City of Florence
 2020 Sotoudeh was on the list of the BBC's 100 Women announced on 23 November 2020
 2022 Genova Hypatia Award for Excellence in Women.

Film appearances
Sotoudeh makes an appearance in filmmaker Jafar Panahi's Taxi, when she sits in Panahi's car on her way to visit an imprisoned client. She is also portrayed in the 2020 film Nasrin'', which focuses on her professional and personal life leading up to her second arrest in 2018.

References

1963 births
Amnesty International prisoners of conscience held by Iran
Children's rights activists
Iranian democracy activists
Iranian dissidents
Iranian human rights activists
Iranian women lawyers
Iranian women's rights activists
Living people
Iranian prisoners and detainees
People convicted of spreading propaganda against the system by the Islamic Republic of Iran
People convicted of action against national security by the Islamic Republic of Iran
Sakharov Prize laureates
BBC 100 Women